Underhill Flats is an unincorporated village and census-designated place (CDP) in the towns of Underhill and Jericho, Chittenden County, Vermont, United States. It was first listed as a CDP prior to the 2020 census.

The CDP is in northeastern Chittenden County, in the western part of the town of Underhill and the northern part of the town of Jericho. It sits in the valley of The Creek where it flows into the Browns River, which forms the southern border of the CDP. The Browns River is a west- and north-flowing tributary of the Lamoille River, in turn a tributary of Lake Champlain.

Vermont Route 15 passes through Underhill Flats, leading north  to Cambridge and southwest  to Jericho.

References 

Populated places in Chittenden County, Vermont
Census-designated places in Chittenden County, Vermont
Census-designated places in Vermont